Jun Yu (born June 5, 1969) is an econometrician. He is the Lee Kong Chian Professor of Economics and Finance at the Singapore Management University. He has previously taught at University of Auckland.

Biography
Yu was born in Ezhou, China. He obtained a BSc in mathematics and BA in economics at Wuhan University in 1990. He began graduate studies in economics at the University of Western Ontario in 1994 under John L. Knight and received his Ph.D. in 1998.

Yu serves as an associate editor for the Journal of Econometrics, Econometric Theory, and the Journal of Financial Econometrics.

Research
Yu's research concentrates on stochastic volatility models, continuous-time models, Bayesian econometrics, and the econometric analysis of economic bubbles. He has developed methods that can detect economic bubbles using time series data. He has also co-authored Financial Econometric Modeling, a financial econometrics textbook published by Oxford University Press.

He has an h-index of 36.

Awards
Yu was elected a Founding Fellow of the Society for Financial Econometrics in 2012. He is also a Fellow of the Journal of Econometrics (2011).

References

External links
Jun Yu at The School of Economics at Singapore Management University
Lee Kong Chian Professor sponsored by Lee Foundation

Economists from Hubei
1969 births
Living people